The 1930 Texas A&M Aggies football team represented the Agricultural and Mechanical College of Texas (now known as Texas A&M University) as a member the Southwest Conference (SWC) during the 1930 college football season. Led by second-year head coach Matty Bell, the Aggies compiled and overall record of 2–7, with a mark of 0–5 in conference play, placing last in the SWC.

Schedule

References

Texas AandM
Texas A&M Aggies football seasons
Texas AandM